Torokhtyanyi (Ukrainian: Торохтяний) is a railway station in Voronivka, Sumy Oblast, Ukraine. It is on the Bilopillya-Basy line of the Sumy Directorate of Southern Railways.

The station is located between Vyry ( away) and Bilopillya ( away) stations.

Passenger service

The station serves both passenger and suburban train on a limited schedule.

Notes

 Tariff Guide No. 4. Book 1 (as of 05/15/2021) (Russian) Archived 05/15/2021.
 Arkhangelsky A.S., Arkhangelsky V.A. in two books. - M.: Transport, 1981. (rus.)

References

External Links

Torokhtyanyi station on railwayz.info
Schedule for passenger trains
Schedule for suburban trains

Railway stations in Sumy Oblast
Sumy
Buildings and structures in Sumy Oblast